Umberto Pettinicchio (born 1943) is an Italian painter and sculptor.

Biography 
He was born in Torremaggiore and moved to Milan, where he studied at the Accademia di Belle Arti di Brera and had his first show in 1969.

His early paintings were in the expressionist style but became increasingly more abstract. His 1981 painting The Death of the Bull is held in the Museo de Arte Moderno y Contemporáneo de Santander y Cantabria.

References

External links

1943 births
Living people
People from the Province of Foggia
20th-century Italian painters
Italian male painters
20th-century Italian male artists